Voodoo may refer to:

Religions 

 African or West African Vodun, practiced by Gbe-speaking ethnic groups
 African diaspora religions, a list of related religions sometimes called Vodou/Voodoo
 Candomblé Jejé, also known as Brazilian Vodum, one of the major branches (nations) of Candomblé
 Tambor de Mina, a syncretic religion that developed in northern Brazil
 Cuban Vodú, a syncretic religion that developed in the Spanish Empire
 Dominican Vudú, a syncretic religion that developed in the Spanish Empire
 Haitian Vodou, a syncretic religion practiced chiefly in Haiti
 Hoodoo (spirituality) or Rootwork, sometimes called Low-Country Voodoo
 Louisiana Voodoo or New Orleans Voodoo, a set of African-based spiritual folkways
 Voodoo in popular culture, fictional characterizations of various forms of Voodoo

Technology

Aircraft 

 Voodoo (aircraft), a highly modified North American P-51 Mustang
 McDonnell F-101 Voodoo, an American supersonic military fighter
 McDonnell CF-101 Voodoo, the F-101 in Canadian service
 McDonnell XF-88 Voodoo, a prototype jet fighter aircraft, the F-101's predecessor

Computing 

 VoodooPC, a brand of high-end personal computers
 Voodoo Graphics, a series of graphics-acceleration cards manufactured by 3dfx Interactive
 Voodoo, a 3D match moving software program
 Voodoo (company), a video game company

Music

Albums 

 Voodoo (D'Angelo album), 2000
 Voodoo (King Diamond album) or the title song, 1998
 Voodoo (Sonny Clark Memorial Quartet album) or the title song, 1986
 Voodoo (VIXX album) or the title song, 2013
 Voodoo, by Alexz Johnson or the title song, 2010
 Voodoo, by Screamin' Sirens, 1987

Songs 

 "Voodoo" (Godsmack song), 1999
 "Voodoo" (Oh Land song), 2011
 "Voodoo", by Adam Lambert from For Your Entertainment, 2009
 "Voodoo", by Alesha Dixon from Fired Up, 2006
 "Voodoo", by Badshah, with J Balvin and Tainy, 2022
 "Voodoo", by Black Sabbath from Mob Rules, 1981
 "Voodoo", by Body Count from Body Count, 1992
 "Voodoo", by Chris Isaak from Silvertone, 1985
 "Voodoo", by Frank Ocean, 2012
 "Voodoo", by Get Scared from Best Kind of Mess, 2011
 "Voodoo", by Ghost Town from Party in the Graveyard, 2013
 "Voodoo", by the Neville Brothers from Yellow Moon, 1989
 "Voodoo", by Nick Jonas from Last Year Was Complicated, 2016
 "Voodoo", by Paul Gross and David Keeley, 1997
 "Voodoo", by Pitbull from El Mariel, 2006
 "Voodoo", by Queen + Paul Rodgers from The Cosmos Rocks, 2008
 "Voodoo", by Robots in Disguise from Get RID!, 2005
 "Voodoo", by Spice Girls from Greatest Hits, 2007
 "Voodoo", by Spiral Beach, 2008
 "Voodoo", by Teddy Pendergrass from A Little More Magic, 1993
 "Voodoo", by Yngwie Malmsteen from Magnum Opus, 1995
 "Voo Doo", by Rachel Sweet, 1982

Other uses in music 

 Voodoo (opera), a 1928 opera by Harry Lawrence Freeman
 Voodoo Amplification, a maker of hand-built guitar amplifiers
 Voodoo Experience, an annual concert in New Orleans, Louisiana, U.S.
 Club Voodoo, a nightclub in Letterkenny, County Donegal, Ireland
 Voodoo, a model of the Gibson Les Paul Studio electric guitar
 DJ VooDoo, of the duo VooDoo & Serano

Other uses in media and entertainment 

 Voodoo (comics), a set index article listing several uses, including:
 Brother Voodoo also known as Doctor Voodoo (Jericho Drumm), a Marvel Comics character
 Voodoo (Wildstorm) (Priscilla Kitaen), a Wildstorm comics character
 Voodoo (film), a 1995 horror film
 Voodoo Moon, 2006 horror film
 Voodoo (roller coaster), now known as Possessed, a ride at Dorney Park & Wildwater Kingdom, Pennsylvania, U.S.
 Voodoo: Truth and Fantasy, a 1993 non-fiction book by Laënnec Hurbon

Sports 

 New Orleans VooDoo, an arena football team
 Vancouver VooDoo, a defunct roller hockey team

See also 

 
 
 Voodoo Child (disambiguation)
 Voodoo doll (disambiguation)
 Voodoo economics, a derogatory term for Reaganomics
 Vudu, a content delivery and media technology company